The Real Thing is an album by American jazz trumpeter Dizzy Gillespie featuring James Moody recorded in 1969 and originally released on the Perception label.

Track listing
All compositions by Mike Longo except as indicated
 "N'Bani" (Dizzy Gillespie) - 4:05
 "Matrix" - 4:04
 "Alligator" - 5:06
 "Closer" [vocal] / "Closer" [instrumental] (George Davis) - 3:17
 "Soul Kiss" - 4:07
 "High on a Cloud" (Fred Norman, Cliff Owens) - 3:20
 "Summertime" (George Gershwin) - 3:46
 "Let Me Outta Here" - 5:13
 "Ding-A-Ling" - 5:03

Personnel
Dizzy Gillespie - trumpet
James Moody - tenor saxophone (tracks 1, 5-8 & 10)
Eric Gale (tracks 1, 6, 7 & 10), George Davis (tracks 2-5, 8 & 9) - guitar
Mike Longo - piano
Nate Edmonds - organ (track 6)
Chuck Rainey (track 6), Phil Upchurch (tracks 2-4, 7 & 8) - electric bass
Paul West - bass (tracks 1, 5, 7 & 10)
Otis "Candy" Finch (track 1, 7 & 10), David Lee (tracks 2-5, 8 & 9), Bernard Purdie (track 6) - drums

References 

Perception Records albums
Dizzy Gillespie albums
1970 albums